Alexander Viktorovich Dergachyov (born 27 September 1996) is a Russian professional ice hockey player. He is currently playing with Avangard Omsk in the Kontinental Hockey League (KHL). He was selected by SKA Saint Petersburg in the 1st round (19th overall) of the 2013 KHL Junior Draft. On 27 June 2015, Alexander was drafted by the NHL's Los Angeles Kings, with the 74th overall pick, in the 2015 NHL Entry Draft.

Playing career
On 1 June 2020, Dergachyov transferred to his third KHL club, HC Vityaz, for the 2020–21 season. In quickly establishing himself within Vityaz, Dergachyov broke out offensively to record career best marks of 11 goals, 12 assists for 23 points through 53 regular season games. 

On 26 May 2021, Dergachyov was traded by Vityaz to newly crowned KHL champions, Avangard Omsk, in exchange for prospect Alexander Yaremchuk and the rights to Oliver Kylington. He was signed to an improved two-year contract to start his tenure with Avangard.

International play
Dergachyov competed with the Russia men's national under-18 ice hockey team at the 2014 IIHF World U18 Championships, and was a member of the Russian Selects for the 2014 Subway Super Series held in Canada. As an 18-year-old, he help helped the Russia men's national junior ice hockey team capture silver at the 2015 World Junior Ice Hockey Championship.

Career statistics

Regular season and playoffs

International

Awards and honors

References

External links 

1996 births
Living people
Avangard Omsk
HC Spartak Moscow players
Los Angeles Kings draft picks
Russian ice hockey centres
SKA-1946 players
SKA Saint Petersburg players
Russian ice hockey right wingers
HC Vityaz players